Machiel is a Dutch form of the masculine given name Michael. People with the name include:

 (born 1972), Dutch historian and writer
Machiel Brandenburg (1907–1984), Dutch painter who emigrated to South Africa
Machiel de Graaf (born 1969), Dutch politician
Machiel van den Heuvel (1900–1946), Dutch army officer, Escape Officer at Colditz
Machiel van Keulen (born c.1984), Dutch footballer
Machiel Hendricus Laddé (1866–1932), Dutch photographer and film director
Machiel Noordeloos (born 1949), Dutch mycologist

See also
Michiel, more common Dutch form of the name
Machiel, town in norther France

Dutch masculine given names